Wang Quan (born 21 November 1992) is a Chinese international handballer, who plays as goalkeeper for Croatian club RK Zagreb.

As an international for China men's national handball team he has competed at the 2010 and 2014 Asian Games, and at the 2010, 2012, 2014, 2016 and 2018 Asian Championship

References

External links
Rk-zamet.hr

1992 births
Living people
Sportspeople from Jiangsu
Handball players at the 2010 Asian Games
Handball players at the 2014 Asian Games
People from Benxi
RK Zamet players
Chinese male handball players
Asian Games competitors for China
Expatriate handball players
Chinese expatriate sportspeople in Croatia